Saint Petersburg Imperial University was a Russian higher education institution based in Saint Petersburg, one of the twelve Imperial universities of the Russian Empire.

University names:
Petersburg Pedagogical Institute (1804–14)
Main Pedagogical Institute (1814–19)
Saint Petersburg University (1819–21)
Saint Petersburg Imperial University (1821–1914)
Petrograd Imperial University (1914–18)
Petrograd State University (1918–24)
Leningrad State University (1924–91)
Saint Petersburg State University (1991-)

History
Saint Petersburg University was founded in February 1819 as a result of the renaming and subsequent reorganization of the Main Pedagogical Institute. In the building of the Twelve Colleges, a solemn ceremony of "opening" the university took place. By this time in the building of the Twelve Colleges for more than 15 years, the Pedagogical Institute was located and operated with all its professors, students, ministers, cabinets and collections in terms of the level of education, but did not have the proper status.

The number of the first students of the university was 90 people.

Shortly after classes opened, a university conference was designed to facilitate the study of students in the division of subjects at the mathematical faculty into physics and mathematics and natural-test subjects, and at the philological faculty to historical, philological and oriental literature.

In 1821, Saint Petersburg University was renamed Saint Petersburg Imperial University.

In 1823, the first university graduation was held - 26 people. In the same year, the university was transferred from the building of the Twelve Colleges to the southern part of the city beyond the Fontanka.

In 1824, a modified version of the charter of Imperial Moscow University was adopted as the first charter of the Saint Petersburg Imperial University, the administration of educational and economic affairs of the university district passed to the council (the former conference).

The university's library in 1827 had 4217 names in 10,815 volumes, numismatic, mineralogical, botanical, zoological, physical cabinets and a chemical laboratory. Some revival of the university's academic activity began in 1827 when six students of the university were sent to Dorpat, Berlin or Paris to prepare for the professorship. With the accession to the Ministry of Public Education Sergey Uvarov (1832), first as a friend of the minister and then the minister, the development of the St. Petersburg University went on quickly.

Since the 1830s, students from aristocratic families attended the university. The new university charter (1835) revived the scientific and teaching activities of the university.

In 1824-1831, 244 students were accepted, of which 115  completed the course. In 1831-1836, 382 students were admitted, of whom 198 completed the course. In total, from the opening of the university until 1837, a three-year course of 365 people graduated.

In 1829, there were 19 full professors and 169 full-time and part-time students at the university. In 1830, Tsar Nicholas returned the entire building of the Twelve Collegia back to the university, and courses resumed there. In 1835, a new Charter of the Imperial Universities of Russia was approved. It provided for the establishment of the Faculty of Law, the Faculty of History and Philology, and the Faculties of Physics and Mathematics, which were merged into the Faculty of Philosophy as the 1st and 2nd Departments, respectively.

In 1839, a temporary "real separation" was formed, for the training of teachers of technical sciences (the department existed 1839-1843 and 1849-1851).

In 1849, after the Spring of Nations, the Senate of the Russian Empire decreed that the Rector should be appointed by the Minister of National Enlightenment rather than elected by the Assembly of the university. However, Pyotr Pletnyov was reappointed Rector and ultimately became the longest-serving rector of Saint Petersburg University (1840–1861).

The need for translators led to the establishment in 1845 of the departments of Armenian, Georgian and Tatar languages. For those preparing for the service in the Kingdom of Poland in the judiciary was introduced in 1841 at the Faculty of Law teaching Polish jurisprudence. In 1843, a special category of "commercial sciences" was formed within the law faculty with the aim of "preparing people capable of serving economic or administrative". The kamerral discharge existed until 1860, when it was replaced by the category "administrative". In 1854 a special faculty of Oriental languages was established from the Department of Oriental Literature of the Faculty of Philology. The revival of academic life began with the return of young scientists sent abroad.

In 1855, Oriental studies were separated from the Faculty of History and Philology, and the fourth faculty, Faculty of Oriental Languages, was formally inaugurated on August 27, 1855.

In 1859–1861, female part-time students could attend lectures in the university. In 1861, there were 1,270 full-time and 167 part-time students in the university, of them 498 were in the Faculty of Law, the largest subdivision. But this subdivision had the cameral studies department, where students learnt safety, occupational health and environmental engineering management and science, including chemistry, biology, agronomy along with law and philosophy. Many Russian, Georgian etc. managers, engineers and scientists studied at the Faculty of law therefore.

During 1861–1862, there was student unrest in the university, and it was temporarily closed twice during the year. The students were denied freedom of assembly and placed under police surveillance, and public lectures were forbidden. Many students were expelled. After the unrest, in 1865, only 524 students remained.

The rector of the university at that time was Pyotr Pletnyov (1840-1861). A special revival of the life of the St. Petersburg University was different in the late 1850s. Students were allowed meetings to discuss their cases; they had a separate library, a reading room, a cash desk to help poor comrades, in favor of which concerts and public lectures were arranged; the "Student's Collection" was published.

In 1861 the emperor accepted the proposal of the graph Sergei Stroganov on the transformations in universities that led to their transformation into educational institutions for the propertied and trustworthy. This was entrusted to the new Minister of Public Education, Admiral Yevfimiy Putyatin, who in July 1861 issued a circular that banned student organizations, which reduced the number of students who were exempt from tuition fees. For violation of discipline, punishment was imposed, up to expulsion from the university. Professors and teachers had to demonstrate their reliability. The circular contained rules on the exact attendance of lectures with observance of the necessary order and silence. The circular caused discontent in the universities, in the autumn of 1861 there were student unrest, manifestations and demonstrations took place, often of a political nature. Against the students, troops, firemen, gendarmes were thrown, arrests began. St. Petersburg University was opened with a month's delay, but the students did not attend lectures, tearing student's books with Putyatin's rules. The lectures were discontinued, and in December 1861 Alexander II issued the highest order for the temporary closure of the university until the introduction of the new university statute. Almost half of the students of St. Petersburg University were arrested and fired from the university. Young professors (including: Mikhail Stasyulevich, Konstantin Kavelin, Alexander Pypin, Włodzimierz Spasowicz and Mykola Kostomarov) - did not find it possible to stay longer at the university and resigned.

It was established to manage the affairs of the university "interim commission" with the rights and duties of council and board. The faculty of Oriental languages, as the only one in the empire, was again open. Since the fall of 1862 the physics and mathematics faculty was opened, and in the fall of 1863 all four faculties were opened, already on the basis of the new university statute of 1863. The first elective rector under the new charter was Professor Emil Lenz.

A decree of the Emperor Alexander II of Russia adopted on February 18, 1863, restored the right of the university assembly to elect the rector. It also formed the new faculty of the theory and history of art as part of the faculty of history and philology.

In March 1869, student unrest shook the university again but on a smaller scale. By 1869, 2,588 students had graduated from the university.

In 1880, the Ministry of National Enlightenment forbade students to marry and married persons could not be admitted. In 1882, another student unrest took place in the university. In 1884, a new Charter of the Imperial Russian Universities was adopted, which granted the right to appoint the rector to the Minister of National Enlightenment again. On March 1, 1887 (O.S.), a group of the university students was arrested while planning an attempt on the life of Alexander III of Russia. As a result, new admission rules to gymnasiums and universities were approved by the Minister of National Enlightenment Ivan Delyanov in 1887, which barred persons of ignoble origin from admission to the university, unless they were extraordinarily talented.

Among the renowned scholars of the second half of the 19th century, affiliated with the university were mathematician Pafnuty Chebyshev, physicist Heinrich Lenz, chemists Dmitri Mendeleev and Aleksandr Butlerov, embryologist Alexander Kovalevsky, physiologist Ivan Sechenov and pedologist Vasily Dokuchaev. The university saw in its departments Nikolai Tagantsev, Aleksandr Gradovsky, Ivan Fojnickij, Friedrich Martens, Filipp Ovsyannikov, Nikolai Wagner, Nikolai Menshutkin, Vasily Vasilievsky, :en:Alexander Veselovsky, Konstantin Bestuzhev-Ryumin, Orest Miller, Vasily Vasilyev, Daniel Chwolson, Ilya Berezin.

On March 24, 1896 (O.S.), on the campus of the university, Alexander Popov publicly demonstrated transmission of radio waves for the first time in history.

By 1894, 9,212 students had graduated from the university.

Number of students in St. Petersburg University:

The distribution of students in the faculties by the beginning of 1899 was as follows: at the Faculty of History and Philology - 178 (4.70%), in physics and mathematics - at the natural level 765 (20.20%), mathematics - 471 (11.93%), and all in the physical and mathematical - 1236; at the Faculty of Law - 2,192 (57.87%), at the Faculty of Oriental Languages - 182 (4.80%).

By the beginning of 1899, the number of teachers at the St. Petersburg University was 221 (in 1869 - 76 teachers). In the library, by the beginning of 1899 there were 127,842 titles of books, in 27,6095 volumes. Other training and support institutions: chemical and physiological laboratories, physical, geological and paleontological offices, botanical (with garden), zoological, mineralogical, zootomical, agronomic, anatomo-histological, geography and anthropology, physical geography, practical mechanics, statistical, legal opened in 1898), criminal law (since 1894), phonetic laboratory (since 1898), astronomical observatory and cabinet, museum of antiquities and fine arts, minz cabinet, meteorologist the Observatory, the offices of physiological and forensic medicine. The new building of the chemical laboratory was opened in 1894.

As of January 1, 1900 (O.S.), there were 2,099 students enrolled in the Faculty of Law, 1,149 students in the Faculty of Physics and Mathematics, 212 students in the Faculty of Oriental Languages and 171 students in the Faculty of History and Philology. In 1902, the first student dining hall in Russia was opened in the university.

Since about 1897, regular strikes and student unrest shook the university and spread to other institutions of higher education across Russia.

Student unrest in 1899 had the consequence of leaving the university with several teachers. In 1905, under the influence of revolutionary events, the government went on to expand the autonomy of universities, giving the professorial councils the right to elect the rector and deans. The first elected rector of St. Petersburg University after the re-election was Ivan Borgman, who five years later (1910) in protest against the violation of the rights of students by the police left this post.

During the Revolution of 1905, the charter of the Russian universities was amended once more; the autonomy of the universities was partially restored and the right to elect the rector was returned to the academic board for the first time since 1884. In 1905–1906, the university was temporarily closed due to student unrest. Its autonomy was revoked again in 1911. In the same year, the university was once again temporarily closed.

In 1914, with the start of the First World War, the university was renamed Petrograd Imperial University after its namesake city. During the War, the university was an important center of mobilization of Russian intellectual resources and scholarship for the victory. In 1915, a branch of the university was opened in Perm, which later became Perm State University.

In 1916, the faculty of the university consisted of 379 people (81 professors, 200 privat-docents, 81 assistant); students numbered 5,964 people, including: at the law faculty - 3,500, in the physics and mathematics department - 2,197 (natural number - 1,200, at the mathematical level - 977), on the historical and philological - 605, on the eastern - 112.

The Assembly of Petrograd Imperial University openly welcomed the February Revolution of 1917, which put an end to the Russian monarchy, and the university came to be known as just Petrograd University. However, after the October Revolution of 1917, the staff and administration of the university were initially vocally opposed to the Bolshevik takeover of power and reluctant to cooperate with the Narkompros. Later in 1917–1922, during the Russian Civil War, some of the staff suspected of counter-revolutionary sympathies suffered imprisonment (e.g., Lev Shcherba in 1919), execution, or exile abroad on the so-called Philosophers' ships in 1922 (e.g., Nikolai Lossky). Furthermore, the entire staff suffered from hunger and extreme poverty during those years. In 1918, the university was renamed 1st Petrograd State University, and in 1919, the Narkompros merged it with the 2nd PSU (former Psychoneurological Institute) and 3rd PSU (former Bestuzhev Higher Courses for Women) into Petrograd State University. In 1919, the Faculty of Social Science was established by the Narkompros instead of the Faculty of History and Philology, Faculty of Oriental Languages and Faculty of Law. Nicholas Marr became the first Dean of the new faculty. Chemist Alexey Favorsky became the Dean of the Faculty of Physics and Mathematics. Rabfaks and free university courses were opened on the basis of the university to provide mass education. In the fall of 1920, as observed by freshman student Alice Rosenbaum, enrollment was open and the majority of the students were anti-communist including, until removed, a few vocal opponents of the regime. Seeing that they were educating "class enemies", a purge was conducted in 1922 based on the class background of the students, and all students, other than seniors, with a bourgeois background were expelled.

Main Pedagogical Institute
In 1786, for teacher training in public schools in Saint Petersburg, a teacher's seminary was established, renamed in 1803 in a teacher's gymnasium, and in 1804 it was named the Pedagogical Institute and was placed in the building of the Twelve Colleges. From October 1808 to 1811, his director was Johann Gottlieb Buhle.

On December 23, 1816, the Pedagogical Institute received the name of the Main Pedagogical Institute and the statute that established a new, six-year course of teaching.

In 1808, the 12 best students of the Institute were sent abroad, who were appointed to take the place of professors and adjuncts "in the proposed university." In 1816, the Main Pedagogical Institute was transformed, and received a device and rights that differed little from university ones.

Thanks to the efforts of the trustee of the Saint Petersburg educational district Sergey Uvarov, the institute was renamed into the university. At the head of the university there was a rector elected annually by professors from among them, but at the same time the post of director who existed at the institute was retained, which was entrusted with the closest supervision of all the internal affairs of the university, excluding scientists provided to the conference. The faculties remained the same as in the institute (philosophical, historical, philological, and physics and mathematics). The university was given the right to establish new departments

In February 1819 the Main Pedagogical Institute was transformed into the Imperial St. Petersburg University. At the same time, until 1824, the university continued to operate under the Charter of the Main Pedagogical Institute, until the Statute of the Imperial Moscow University was introduced in it.

Chronology of main events

University rectors played an important role in its development.

List of rectors
 1819–1821 
 1821–1825 Yevdokim Zyablovskiy
 1825–1836 
 1836–1840 
 1840–1861 Pyotr Pletnyov
 1861–1863 Aleksandr Voskresensky
 1863–1865 Heinrich Lenz
 1865–1867 Aleksandr Voskresensky
 1867–1873 Karl Kessler
 1873–1876 
 1876–1883 Andrey Beketov
 1883–1887 
 1887–1890 
 April–December 1890 
 1890–1897 
 1897–1899 
 1899–1903 
 1903–1905 
 1905–1910 Ivan Borgman
 1910–1911 David Grimm
 1911–1918

References

Bibliography
 
 
 
 
 
 Сухомлинов М. И. Русские университеты, учрежденные в начале царствования имп. Александра I. — Спб., 1865.
 Эймонтова Р. Г. Русские университеты на грани двух эпох. — М., 1985.
 Российские университеты в XVII—XX веках. — Воронеж, 1998 — Вып.3, 1998 — Вып.5, 2000. Вып.5.
 Петров Ф. А. Формирование системы университетского образования в России. Т.1. Российские университеты и Устав 1804 года. М., 2002; Т.2. Становление системы университетского образования в первые десятилетия XIX в. М., 2002; Т.3. Университетская профессура и подготовка Устава 1835 года. М., 2003; Т.4. Российские университеты и люди 1840-х годов. Ч.1. Профессура. Ч.2. Студенчество. М., 2003.
 
 Плетнев П. А.  Первое двадцатипятилетие императорского Спб. университета. СПб., 1844
 Ростовцев Е.А. Столичный университет Российской империи: ученое сословие, общество и власть (вторая половина XIX – начало XX в.), Москва: Политическая энциклопедия, 2017. 903 c.
 
 
 Словарь профессоров и преподавателей Санкт-Петербургского университета 1819-1917 // Биографика СПбГУ
 Спасович В. Д. Пятидесятилетие Петербургского университета // Вестник Европы. 1870. Апрель. С. 765-779; Вестник Европы. 1870. Май. С. 312-345.
 Юбилейный акт Имп. СПб. университета. СПб., 1869

External links 

 Андреев А. Ю. Российские университеты XVIII — первой половины XIX века в контексте университетской истории Европы
 Образование в XIX веке
 ИМПЕРАТОРСКИЕ УНИВЕРСИТЕТЫ
 Как жили студенты Петербургского университета в первой половине XIX века Санкт-Петербургский университет № 2-3 (3788-3789), 20 февраля 2009 года
 А. И. Аврус ИСТОРИЯ РОССИЙСКИХ УНИВЕРСИТЕТОВ
 История Санкт-Петербургского университета XVIII—XXI вв. Материалы к комплексной библиографии.
 История Санкт-Петербургского университета в виртуальном пространстве

Educational institutions established in 1819
Education in the Russian Empire
Saint Petersburg State University